Hayagreeva "Huggy" Rao (born 27 April 1959) is an American academic. He is the Atholl McBean Professor of Organizational Behavior and Human Resources at the Stanford Graduate School of Business.

Early life 

Rao was born in India. Rao graduated from the Andhra University in 1978 and earned Post-Graduate Diploma in Personnel Management and Industrial Relations from XLRI, Jamshedpur in 1980. He then earned a PhD in 1989 from Weatherhead School of Management, Case Western Reserve University.

Career 

Rao was an assistant professor of Organization & Management at the Emory University's Goizueta Business School from 1989 to 1994, then associate professor from 1995 to 2002 and then tenured professor from 2000 to 2002. He then moved to Kellogg School of Management, Northwestern University where he was the Richard L.Thomas Distinguished Professor of Leadership and Organizational Change from 2002 to 2005. He has been with Stanford University since 2005.

At Stanford, he is also professor of sociology at School of Humanities and Sciences. He studies collective action within organizations and in markets. His research revolves around scaling up mobilization, innovation, and talent in organizations.

Honors and awards

 Wall Street Journal Best Seller List for 2014 for Scaling Up Excellence
 Best Books of 2014 Financial Times, Inc Magazine, Forbes, Washington Post, and Amazon for Scaling Up Excellence
 BP Faculty Fellow in Global Management, 2018-2020
 Fellow, Academy of Management, 2008
 Fellow of Sociological Research Association, American Sociological Association, 2007
 W. Richard Scott Distinguished Award for Scholarly Contributions, American Sociological Association, 2005
 Sidney Levy Award For Teaching, Kellogg School of Management, 2004
 Fellow, Center for Advanced Study in Behavioral Science, 2004

Editorial Review Boards 

 American Sociological Review, 2012-2015
 Administrative Science Quarterly, 2003-2011, 1996-2002
 American Journal of Sociology, 1999-2003
 Organization Science, 1997-2002.
 Academy of Management Review, 1998-2002
 Journal of Management Inquiry, 1996-2002
 Strategic Organization, 2001–present
 Organizational Behavior Society, 1997–present
 Organization and Innovation Panel, National Science Foundation, 2000-2002

Selected bibliography
 Rao, Hayagreeva; Sutton, Robert I. (4 February 2014). Scaling Up Excellence: Getting to More Without Settling for Less. Crown
 Rao, Hayagreeva (1 December 2008). Market Rebels: How Activists Make or Break Radical Innovations. Princeton University Press
Rao, Hayagreeva. "The social construction of reputation: Certification contests, legitimation, and the survival of organizations in the American automobile industry: 1895–1912." Strategic Management Journal 15.S1 (1994): 29-44.
Bhattacharya, Chitrabhan B., Hayagreeva Rao, and Mary Ann Glynn. "Understanding the bond of identification: An investigation of its correlates among art museum members." Journal of Marketing 59.4 (1995): 46-57.
Rao, Hayagreeva, Philippe Monin, and Rodolphe Durand. "Institutional change in Toque Ville: Nouvelle cuisine as an identity movement in French gastronomy." American Journal of Sociology 108.4 (2003): 795-843.
Rao, Hayagreeva, Calvin Morrill, and Mayer N. Zald. "Power plays: How social movements and collective action create new organizational forms." Research in Organizational Behavior 22 (2000): 237-281.

References 

Living people
Indian emigrants to the United States
Andhra University alumni
XLRI – Xavier School of Management alumni
Case Western Reserve University alumni
Stanford University Graduate School of Business faculty
1959 births